John Howard "Howie" Carter (October 13, 1904 – July 24, 1991) was a Major League Baseball second baseman and third baseman who played with the Cincinnati Reds in . He played in five games, but only got one at bat.

External links

Cincinnati Reds players
1904 births
1991 deaths
Baseball players from New York (state)
Burials at Gate of Heaven Cemetery (Hawthorne, New York)
Peoria Tractors players